Sophiahemmet is a private hospital at Norra Djurgården in Stockholm, Sweden. It is associated with the Sophiahemmet University College.  Its connection with the royal family goes back to 1884 when nursing education sponsored by Queen Sophia was still being conducted at the university. The private hospital was constructed in 1889 at its current location on Valhallavägen.

On 1 January 2016, Princess Sofia, Duchess of Värmland was announced as the honorary president of the hospital, replacing Princess Christina, Mrs. Magnuson, who had served as honorary president since 1972.

Gallery

References 
 Erik Wilhelm Dahlgren, red (1897). Stockholm: Sveriges hufvudstad : skildrad med anledning af Allmänna konst- och industriutställningen 1897 enligt beslut af Stockholms stadsfullmäktige. Stockholm: J. Beckman. Libris 20803

Hospital buildings completed in the 19th century
Hospitals in Sweden
Buildings and structures in Stockholm
19th century in Stockholm